The Statute Law Revision Act 2016 is a Statute Law Revision Act enacted by the Oireachtas in Ireland to review Acts of the Oireachtas passed from 1922 to 1950.  It also amended the Statute Law Revision Act 2007 to revive one Act that had been repealed in 2007.  The Act is part of the Statute Law Revision Programme which has also seen the enactment of statute law revision legislation between 2005 and 2016.

Scope
The Act repealed 297 of the 707 in force Acts dating from 1922 to 1950, or about 42% of the total such Acts.  It was described by the Minister for Public Expenditure and Reform as "the first comprehensive review of Acts enacted by the Oireachtas "

References

External links
The Statute Law Revision Act 2016 from the Irish Statute Book.

2016 in Irish law
Acts of the Oireachtas of the 2010s
Legal history of Ireland
Statute Law Revision 2016